Jim Keefe (born 1965) is an American cartoonist. He is the most recent artist to contribute original art and stories to the Flash Gordon comic strip.

Career
A graduate of The Kubert School, Keefe started his career as the head colorist in the King Features Syndicate comic art department, coloring such world-renowned strips as Blondie, Beetle Bailey, and Hägar the Horrible.

From 1996 to 2003 he was the writer and artist of Flash Gordon (which at that point was running only on Sundays) for King Features  – currently available online at FlashGordon.com.

Teaching and speaking engagements include the School of Visual Arts in Manhattan, Malloy College and Hofstra University's UCCE Youth Programs in Long Island, New York – and most recently as an adjunct teacher at the Minneapolis College of Art and Design.

Since 2013, Keefe has been the artist of the Sally Forth comic strip, written by Francesco Marciuliano. Sally Forth is syndicated worldwide by King Features and appears in nearly 700 newspapers.

References

External links 
 

American comic strip cartoonists
Living people
1965 births
Comics colorists